Gevorg Gourgeni Dabaghyan (b.1965) is an Armenian duduk player of liturgical and folk music, born in Yerevan. In 1991 he founded the Shoghaken Folk Ensemble, a group of Armenian folk musicians and singers who specialize in traditional Armenian music.

He was part of Yo-Yo Ma's Silk Road Project in 2005 and appears on the Silk Road Journeys: Beyond the Horizon, a 2005 album by Yo-Yo Ma and the Silk Road Ensemble.

Discography
Solo recordings
[1996] Music of Armenia.Vol.3: Duduk(Celestial Harmonies)
[2002] Miniatures(Traditional Crossroads)
With Shoghaken Folk Ensemble
[1996] The Music of Armenia, Vol. 5: Folk Music(Celestial Harmonies)
[2002] Armenia Anthology(Traditional Crossroads)
[2004] Traditional Dances Of Armenia(Traditional Crossroads)
[2005] Hasmik Harutyunyan with The Shoghaken Ensemble - Armenian Lullabies
[2007] Shoghaken Ensemble - Music from Armenia(Traditional Crossroads)
With Komitas Quartet
[2005]Vache Sharafyan-On The Fortieth Day(Traditional Crossroads)
[2008]Lost Songs from Eden(Traditional Crossroads)
With Rabih Abou-Khalil
[2007]Songs for Sad Women (Enja)
With Mannik Grigorian
[1996]Mannik Grigorian – Van: Armenian Folk Songs(MEG Recordings)

References

Armenian musicians
Armenian academics
Dudukahars
Living people
1965 births